BBC in Concert may refer to:

 BBC in Concert (Killing Joke album), 1995
 BBC in Concert 1972–1973, a 1997 album by Badfinger